This is a list of Thor's rogues gallery.

A
 Absorbing Man - Carl 'Crusher' Creel was given the power to take the form of any material he touched, "absorbing" the property of the material itself. The Absorbing Man was given his powers by the Asgardian god Loki in a plot to defeat Loki's brother Thor.
 Ares – The son of Zeus and Hera, he was worshiped as the god of war in ancient Greece and Rome. Ares' dissatisfaction with Zeus' rule of Olympus began after Zeus' decree that worship of the Olympians should be allowed to die out.
 Atum – Also known as Demogorge the God Eater, a being created to consume the gods.
 Apocalypse - A powerful mutant who convinced people that he was a deity.
 Arkin – Also known as Arkin the Weak. When he heard of Thor's banishment, he rushed to tell Queen Knorda of the mountain giants, in hopes of winning her love, though this was a ruse created by both Thor and Odin to weed out a traitor in the Asgardian court. First appearance Journey into Mystery #109 (October 1964).

B
 Black Winter - A multiversal cosmic entity that consumes entire universes and had used Galactus as his herald.
 Blackheart – The demon son of the demon-lord Mephisto.
 Bloodaxe – A woman named Jackie Lucas who found the axe once wielded by Skurge the Executioner, and, picking up the axe, was transformed by its magic into a superhuman being. She was primarily an enemy of Thunderstrike.

C
 Crusader – A seminary student in Chicago who believed that the Roman Catholic Church should become more active in fighting paganism and godlessness in modern society.
 Carbon-Copy Men – Shapeshifting aliens who tried to take over the world by impersonating people and causing chaos. They were defeated by Thor and their leader was hurled into space by him, where he died.

D
 Dario Agger – Dario Agger is the CEO of Roxxon Energy Corporation who possesses the ability to transform into a Minotaur.
 Desak – The God-Slayer of unnamed world, where the inhabitants worship a god called Kronnitt.
 Destroyer – An enchanted suit of armor forged by Odin. To be activated, the spirit of another must enter it, which leaves their body inanimate.
 Doctor Doom - The Fantastic Four's deadliest enemy. He is the ruler of Latveria. 
 Dormammu - The ruler of Dark Dimension. He is the archenemy of Doctor Strange.
 Durok the Demolisher – A creature created by Karnilla the Norn Queen at the behest of Loki to defeat Thor. Slain by Thor.

E
 Ego the Living Planet – In the so-called "Black Galaxy", a portion of space unknown to Earth, the entity known as Ego came into being as any planet would, from coalescing cosmic gases and dust. However, Ego evolved consciousness and intelligence as well. He can control his body and even create organisms from it.
 Enchanters Three – Brothers who hail from the realm of Ringsfjord, which exists on the extra-dimensional continent of Asgard.
 Enchantress – Asgardian called Amora (based on the Latin word for love) who began learning magic as an apprentice of Karnilla the Norn Queen, but was eventually banished. She continued learning magic on her own, notably by seducing others well-versed in magic and learning their secrets. She is among the best Asgardian spellcasters. 
 Executioner – Skurge, the son of an Asgardian goddess and a Storm Giant who fell in love with Amora. He is one of the strongest and greatest warriors in Asgard. However, he later died on a mission to the Underworld by sacrificing himself to save Thor.

F
 Fafnir – Once the King of Nastrond, a land on the other-dimensional continent of Asgard.
 Fenris Wolf – A child of the trickster Loki and the giantess Angrboda. A mystical wolf of the Asgardian dimension of Niffelheim.

G
 Galactus – Only survivor of the universe before the Big Bang. The Devourer of Worlds.
 Geirrodur - Geirrodur is the king of the Trolls that live beneath Asgard. Geirrodur carries a spear called Tordenstok. It is made of uru, a metal found only in the realm of the Trolls, and has certain mystical properties, as well as being virtually unbreakable. Geirrodur has enslaved Orikal on more than one occasion.
 Gorr the God Butcher – An alien whose bitterness at the lack of godly intervention and discovery of the powerful Necrosword causes him to go on a quest to destroy every god in the Marvel Universe. 
 Grey Gargoyle – A French chemist and lab assistant who gained his powers, including turning people to stone for an hour with a touch, by accidentally spilling an unknown concoction on himself, also giving himself a stone-like form, though he can still move.
 Grog – The God-Slayer, a member of the Heliopolitan race of gods.
 Growing Man – A stimuloid, a form of android created by the Kosmosians, an alien race enslaved by Kang the Conqueror, the ruler of an alternate future Earth.
 Grundroth - Grundroth is the leader of the Frost Giants. He took over the now-human-sized Giants after their previous leader, Skrymir, was defeated by Balder. Loki convinced Grundroth that he could aid them by kidnapping the Iceman and using him to return the Giants to their proper height.

H
 Hela – A child of the trickster god Loki and the giantess Angrboda. The Asgardian goddess of death and ruler of Hel and Niflheim, two of the Nine Realms.
 High Evolutionary - A scientist who seeks to evolve animals.

J
 Juggernaut – Army soldier exposed to the Crimson Gem of Cyttorak. Stepbrother of Professor X.

K
 Karnilla – The Norn Queen is a sorceress and the queen of Nornheim (one of the Asgardian provinces).
 King Cobra - A snake-themed supervillain. He is the original member of Serpent Squad. He worked alongside Mister Hyde against Captain America and other heroes.
 Kryllk the Cruel – An Asgardian Troll leader who fought Spider-Man and Thor.
 Kurse – The most powerful of the Dark Elves, who was known as Algrim the Strong. He is coerced by the Dark Elf Malekith the Accursed.
 Knorda – Though human-sized, Knorda is an Asgardian queen of the Mountain Giants and possesses superhuman strength and durability, as well as being highly resistant to cold, aging and conventional disease. Given her garment, one would speculate that she is an experienced warrior. When Arkin the Weak tells Knorda that Thor was banished by Odin, she leads her people and Arkin into combat, though she is defeated when it is revealed that Thor's banishment is a ruse. In defeat, she offers her axe and tells Arkin to never speak to her again. (first appearance: Journey Into Mystery #109)

L
 Laufey – The ruler of the Frost Giants of Jotunheim, one of the Nine Worlds of Asgardian cosmology and Loki's biological father.
 Loki – Thor's archenemy and adoptive brother. The son of Laufey, ruler of the Frost Giants of Jotunheim, one of the "Nine Worlds" of the Asgardian cosmology. He is a master of spellcasting and trickery.
 Lorelei – The sister of Amora the Enchantress, who possesses some skills in Asgardian magic and seduction.

M
 Malekith the Accursed – The ruler of the Dark Elves of Svartalfheim, one of the Nine Worlds of Asgardian cosmology.
 Man Beast - The Man-Beast was once an ordinary red wolf that is captured and mutated on Mount Wundagore by the High Evolutionary - a being intent on creating an army of New Men from animals.
 Mangog – He is the sum total of the hatred of a billion billion beings that were once killed by the ruler of Asgard. Imprisoned deep beneath Asgard, Mangog is accidentally freed by the Rock Troll Ulik, and seeks to destroy Asgard.
 Marduk - Marduk is the God of Wisdom and the sun in Sumerian Mythology. He attacked the Asgardians seeking to take their power for his own, but was defeated by Thor. 
 Megatak – An industrial spy. He was inside an experimental video display when he gained his powers.
 Mephisto – A demon-lord who rules a Hell dimension and has clashed with Thor on different occasions.
 Mercurio the 4-D Man – Alien with the ability to generate flames from the right hand and extreme cold from the left.
 Midgard Serpent – A monstrous snake large enough to coil around the Earth whom Thor is destined to battle during Ragnarök.
 Mister Hyde – Amoral doctor turned rampaging strong man when he takes a potion he invented and former partner of the King Cobra.
 Mongoose – Probably a real mongoose before his powers were genetically engineered by the High Evolutionary to serve as his agent.

N
 Nobilus - A clone of Thor created by the High Evolutionary from Thor's DNA samples.

P
 Pluto – The Roman god of the Underworld and the dead.
 Perrikus – Member of a race known as the Dark Gods.

Q
 Quicksand – Once a scientist working at a nuclear facility. An accident transforms her body into a sand-like substance.

R
 Radioactive Man – A Chinese physicist who can manipulate radiation due to deliberate exposure to it after the Chinese government tried to create a super-being.
 Ragnarok – An cyborg clone of Thor with the same powers and abilities as Thor.

S
 Sandu - A circus performer with limited extrasensory powers which were enhanced by Loki.
 Seth – Egyptian god of evil.
 Shatterfist – user of the 'Power Gloves', member of the Masters of Evil.
 Stellaris – A warrior who fought Thor while she sought vengeance against the Celestials.
 Sindr – Queen of Cinders and Daughter of Surtur, Sindr spreads her purging flames across the ten Realms.
 Surtur – A Fire Demon of Muspellheim, one of the Nine Worlds of Asgardian cosmology, and ruler of the Fire Demons, with power rivaling that of Odin.

T
 Thanos - A Mad Titan
 Thermal Man – A Chinese humanoid capable of energy projection.
 Titania – A supervillainess who is married to the Absorbing Man and was given superhuman strength by Doctor Doom.

U
 Ulik – The strongest and fiercest of the Rock Trolls, born millennia ago in Asgard.
 Utgard-Loki - The monarch of the Frost Giants of Jotunheim.

V
 Venom – The most prominent member of the symbiote race, Malekith used the symbiote against Thor in emulation to Gorr and Knull.

W
 Wrecking Crew – Four supervillains whose flesh have been toughened by Asgardian magic.

Y
 Ymir – A Frost Giant who formed at the beginning of creation in a place called Niffleheim.

Z
 Zarrko the Tomorrow Man – An evil scientist from the future, who built a time machine to escape from his peaceful 23rd century and visit more primitive periods, hoping to become a ruler.

More information

Fenris Wolf

The Fenris Wolf is a fictional character appearing in American comic books published by Marvel Comics, based on the wolf Fenrir from Norse mythology.

Publication history
The Fenris Wolf first appeared in Marvel Comics in Journey into Mystery #114 (March 1965), and was adapted from Norse legends by Stan Lee and Jack Kirby.

The character subsequently appeared in Thor #276-278 (Oct.–Dec. 1978) and Thor (vol. 2) #80-83 (Aug.–Oct. 2004) and 85 (Dec. 2004).

The Fenris Wolf received an entry in the Official Handbook of the Marvel Universe Deluxe Edition #4.

Fictional character biography
The Fenris Wolf is a creature of Asgardian origin, said to be the offspring of Loki and the giantess Angrboda.

However, many years ago, he was part of the basis of the story Little Red Riding Hood. The goddess Iduna walks the forests of Asgard carrying a bundle of golden apples. These "Golden Apples of Immortality" are for All-Father Odin, and Iduna takes them to him every year. Along her journey, she meets Haakun the Hunter. Haakun greets her warmly and tells her to go in peace.

As Iduna continues further down the path, the Fenris Wolf sees her and transforms himself. Iduna next comes upon "a frail stranger". The stranger offers Iduna protection along her journey, but she declines the offer. The stranger takes a strong interest in Iduna's basket and begins asking her questions. She quickly grows suspicious, saying his hands seem so grasping and brutal, and his voice sounds like that of a beast. She finds his manner sinister and frightening, and says his eyes burn with hatred and pure savagery. She then discovers that the stranger is actually the Fenris Wolf in disguise. The Fenris Wolf shapeshifts into his true form and attacks her. Haakun the Hunter arrives and drives the Fenris Wolf away with his enchanted battle axe, causing the Fenris Wolf to shrink in an attempt to escape. The axe pursues the Fenris Wolf and finally strikes him, spiriting him off to the shadowy land of Varinheim.

Just like Norse mythology, Odin had the Dwarfs forge the chain Gleipnir ("deceiver" or "entangler"). It appeared to be only a silken ribbon, but was made of six wondrous ingredients: the sound of a cat's footfall, the beard of a woman, the roots of a mountain, bear's sinews, fish's breath, and bird's spittle (which explains why these things are not found today). When it came to binding the Fenris Wolf, Tyr lost his hand in the process, as the Fenris Wolf would only allow the chain to be put on him if one of the gods put their hand in his mouth.

It is prophesied that when Ragnarok occurs, the Fenris Wolf will devour Odin.

Hela at one time unchained the Fenris Wolf to bring about Ragnarok, only to be thwarted by Thor.

A giant offspring of the Fenris Wolf, named Hoarfen, once battled the Hulk and his Pantheon allies. The battle goes poorly for Hoarfen, causing him many injuries.

True Ragnarok
Loki later unchained the Fenris Wolf to aid him, Ulik, and Hyrm in attacking Asgard, using weapons that were forged for them by Surtur. Ulik and the Fenris Wolf attacked Thor together, only for Thor to attack them using Mjolnir, which resulted in the blast removing Sif's arm. Hyrm joined up with Ulik and the Fenris Wolf and managed to shatter Mjolnir.

The Fenris Wolf then attacked Thor, Captain America, and Iron Man when they were in Asgard. When the Fenris Wolf was about to attack Thor, Captain America kicked the Fenris Wolf in the stomach to reclaim his shield, then Thor defeated him, causing him to flee.

When Kurse was protecting innocent children, the Fenris Wolf fought Kurse and killed him by sending a hammer into his skull.

The Fenris Wolf assisted in the attack on Vanaheim and faced Thor again in battle. Thor bound the Fenris Wolf in chains and used his body to knock down Durok in order to save Sif. With Durok slain, the Fenris Wolf snapped his chains and fought Thor, only to be struck down by Beta Ray Bill. Beta Ray Bill used the power of his hammer Stormbreaker upon the Fenris Wolf, reducing him to a skeleton as the monster's punishment for attacking a weakened Thor. Those that were fighting with the Fenris Wolf fled.

The Fenris Wolf returned to life and swallowed Asgard's sun and moon assisting to bring about Ragnarok, as Asgard perishes.

The Fenris Wolf is the ancestor of the Asgardian Hrimhari.

Asgard reforms and re-establishes itself over the state of Oklahoma. The Fenris Wolf escapes from his prison, a place deep in the dimensional 'Hells' and steals a technological device that would slaughter innocents, humans and gods alike. The Warriors Three, with the aid of a superpowered A.I.M. scientist, defeat him in honorable battle. He is now kept prisoner in an Asgardian courtyard, where he may be better supervised.

Film

 The Fenris Wolf appears in Thor: Tales of Asgard, voiced by Brian Drummond. The Fenris Wolf is seen as a patron at a bar.
 The Fenris Wolf appears in Thor: Ragnarok. This iteration of the character is female. She is the loyal pet of Hela and is resurrected alongside Hela's army to aid Hela in ruling Asgard. During the film's climax, the Fenris Wolf battles the Hulk and gets tossed off the side of Asgard into the void below.

Television
 The Fenris Wolf appears in The Avengers: Earth's Mightiest Heroes, with vocal effects provided by Fred Tatasciore. In the episode "Meet Captain America", It is seen among the Asgardian creatures that the Red Skull and Baron Strucker captured upon finding an entrance to Asgard.
 The Fenris Wolf appears in Ultimate Spider-Man. In the two-part episode "Avenging Spider-Man", it is among the Asgardian creatures subjected to Doctor Octopus's mass-produced Venom symbiote commanded by Loki.
 The Fenris Wolf appears in Avengers: Ultron Revolution. In the episode "A Friend in Need", he is shown incarcerated in the Asgardian prison. The history of Tyr losing a hand to the Fenris Wolf was intact, as mentioned by Thor to the Vision.

Video games
 An assortment of Fenris Wolves serve as enemies in Marvel: Ultimate Alliance. The "Hand of Tyr" must be placed into a statue of the Fenris Wolf's mouth to proceed and rescue Tyr.

References

 
Lists of Marvel Comics characters
Lists of Marvel Comics supervillains
Enemies